Geza Furetz (born 12 June 1930) is a Romanian former boxer. He competed in the men's heavyweight event at the 1952 Summer Olympics.

References

External links
 

1930 births
Possibly living people
Romanian male boxers
Olympic boxers of Romania
Boxers at the 1952 Summer Olympics
Sportspeople from Timișoara
Heavyweight boxers